The BMA Grey Line is a planned monorail line in Bangkok, Thailand, linking Watcharaphon with Thong Lo. The route would provide a vital north - south link for a distance of 16.25 km with 15 planned stations and is expected to cost 27 billion baht. The line would support the growth of residential areas around Pradit Manutham Rd and Kaset-Namawin rd corridors and is forecast to eventually have 370,000 passengers per day. The BMA Grey with interchange with other lines including the MRT Pink Line (under construction), the proposed MRT Brown Line, the MRT Yellow Line (under construction), MRT Orange Line (under construction) and BTS Sukhumvit Line.

The BMA is awaiting completion of a consultants study into the project which was due to be completed by March 2022. A new EIA for the line was completed and approved by the National Environment Board in early March 2022. On 17 March 2022, the BMA held a market sounding seminer with companies interested in potentially bidding for the line and updated that the feasibility study would be completed by early June 2022.

The BMA proposes to gain Cabinet approval for the line in 2023 and identify private investor partners in 2024-2025 with a view to commencing construction in 2026 in order for the line to open in 2030. However, property developers have requested that this timeframe be decreased as they believe it is too slow.

Route Alignment
The route runs from Ram Indra Road, in the northeast of Bangkok, where it interchanges with the MRT Pink Line (under construction) 
running south on Pradit Manuthum Rd along the Chalongrat Expressway corridor. It then interchanges with the proposed MRT Brown Line at Chalongrat Intersection (Kaset-Namawin rd) and continues further south to interchange with MRT Yellow Line at Lat Phrao rd before continuing further south along Pradit Manuthum Rd to interchange with the MRT Orange Line at Rama 9. Finally, the line continues south then south west into Sukhumvit soi 55 before terminating at the downtown district of Thong Lo where it interchanges with BTS Sukhumvit Line.

History
In August 2011, the newly elected Yingluck Shinawatra government decided to defer plans for the Grey Line and the Light Blue Line, citing that the lines are not a priority within their current 10 lines Master plan. The government suggested the Bangkok Metropolitan Administration pursue construction but stated that the BMA would have to fully fund the line itself.

The BMA stated in mid 2013 that it considered the line a priority and wanted to progress planning by completing an EIA by the end of 2013 with the aim for the line to be tendered by early 2014. Construction would have then taken place from 2015 - 2017 for a potential opening in 2018.
In March 2014, the OTP stated that they would contract a consultant to undertake further study of the line. In May 2014, a consultant was contracted to undertake a financial feasibility study of the line, scheduled to complete the work by the end of 2014. A second public hearing on the proposed line was held in January 2015. An environmental impact assessment was completed in September 2016. However, the EIA did not receive approval from the National Environment Board thus suspending the project.

Recent planning progress
In June 2018, the Bangkok Metropolitan Administration (BMA) vowed to revive the project by rectifying the EIA and resolve opposition from locals in the Thong Lor area. The BMA also sought to gain approval and support from the Expressway Authority of Thailand (EXAT) to construct the line along the Pradit Monutham rd/Chalongrat Expressway corridor. In September 2018, the MRTA Governor stated that the MRTA would like to build the proposed Grey line in order to provide a feeder line to the MRT Pink Line and the MRT Brown Line. Also, given that the MRTA was already working with the Expressway Authority of Thailand regarding an integrated design for the MRT Brown line, the MRTA could use that experience to gain access to land needed for the Grey line, especially at the MRT Brown line interchange at Kaset-Namawin rd. However, the BMA refused to transfer the line to the MRTA.

In August 2021, the BMA hired consulting firms to provide analysis for a public-private partnership (PPP) to build the line. The consultants feasibility study was expected to completed by March 2022. However on 17 March 2022, the BMA held a market sounding seminar with companies interested in potentially bidding for the line and updated that the feasibility study would be completed by early June 2022. During the seminar, the BMA also presented engineering and environmental data to the companies. The BMA forecasts 97,000 pax per day when the line is planned to open in 2030 rising to 161,000 pax per day by 2034. After 40 years, the line is forecast to have 370,000 daily pax. A final seminar was held on 27 May 2022. The BMA advised that it would seek approval for the line from the Ministry of Interior in 2–3 months. Reporters in attendance also noted that the newly elected BMA Governor had expressed a preference for the MRTA to handle the project.

Potential Phase 2 & 3 extensions
Also under consideration is a Phase 2 and Phase 3 extension along the length of Rama 3 rd, over the Chao Phraya river and along Ratchadapisek rd (Inner Ring rd) to Tha Phra to replace the BRT along this route. This would enable the Grey Line to interchange with the BTS Silom Line at Talat Phlu station, the future MRT Purple Line (Phase 2) southern extension and link with the MRT Blue Line extension at Tha Phra station. If the Phase 3 extension is built, the total route distance would be 39.9 km. In September 2019, it was announced that the monorail would be built as two disconnected sections and could be ready by 2023.

A possible Phase 2 extension would extend from Sukhumvit Rd., along Rama IV Rd., and Ratchadaphisek - Rama 3 Rd and end at The Rama IX Bridge at the Chao Praya river and service the Sathupradit area in Yan Nawa District. The Phase 2 extension would result in a route that is approximately 26 km long. It would also essentially replace much of the Bangkok BRT route.

A planned Phase 3 extension from The Rama IX Bridge /Rama 3 rd and would continue along Ratchadapisek rd to link with the BTS Silom Line at Talat Phlu station, the future MRT Purple Line (Phase 2) southern extension and eventually terminate with the MRT Blue Line extension at Tha Phra station. A Phase 3 expansion would result in a total distance for the Grey Line of 39.9 km.

Stations
The route has a total of 15 planned stations.

For the potential Phase 2 & 3 sections, 24 stations are proposed. (Note: The Bangkok BRT would be replaced along this section) .

Network Map

See also

 Mass Rapid Transit Master Plan in Bangkok Metropolitan Region
 MRT (Bangkok)
 MRT Blue Line
 MRT Brown Line
 MRT Light Blue Line
 MRT Orange Line
 MRT Pink Line
 MRT Purple Line
 MRT Yellow Line
 BTS Skytrain
 BTS Sukhumvit Line
 BTS Silom Line
 Airport Rail Link (Bangkok)
 SRT Light Red Line
 SRT Dark Red Line
 Bangkok BRT
 BMA Gold Line
 BMA Bang Na-Suvarnabhumi Line

References 

Grey Line
Proposed public transport in Thailand
Monorails in Thailand
Monorails